Sheldon Bernard Kopp (29 March 1929 – 29 March 1999) was a psychotherapist and author, based in Washington, D.C. He was born in New York City, and received his PhD from the New School for Social Research.  In addition to his private practice, he served as a Psychotherapy Supervisor for the Pastoral Counselling and Consultation Centres in Washington.  He died of cardiac arrhythmia and pneumonia.
He is also popular for his quotes.
One of them is, "All of the significant battles are waged within the self."

Bibliography

References

Sheldon Kopp, 70, Psychologist Who Wrote About Self-Esteem - New York Times obituary

External links

Sheldon Kopp's Eschatological Laundry List
Dr. Kopp´s obituary

1929 births
1999 deaths
American self-help writers
American spiritual writers
Writers from New York City
Writers from Washington, D.C.
American psychotherapists
20th-century American non-fiction writers